Efird is a surname. Notable people with the surname include:

Cynthia Efird (born 1950), American diplomat and ambassador
David Efird (born 1974), American lecturer, philosopher, and priest